Merlin is a dramatic narrative poem by Edwin Arlington Robinson, written in 1917.

Description
The poem is entirely modern in its spirit and treatment, with lines like these that mark its date:

In Robinson's poem, King Arthur and his knights are not romantic heroes, as other poets have made them, not "our conception of what knighthood should be"; they are a modern poet's conception of what leaders of men always and universally are – king, warrior, lover, fool; Arthur, Gawaine, Lancelot, Dagonet. Nor is Robinson's Merlin like Tennyson's – a magician in his dotage falling a victim to the wiles of a false woman. He is a prophet whose "memories go forward"; he is a man "Who saw himself, A sight no other man has ever seen," and he follows Vivian, "a woman who is worth a grave," because Fate wills it so. In Merlin, Robinson revivifies, not the age of chivalry, but our own time, our own double world of hope and of reality, with its loves, faith, fears, wars and failures.  The philosophy of the poem, that faith and creative love will someday save the world, is a lustrous background for the story: "The torch of woman, who, together with the light That Galahad found, is yet to light the world." As a tale Merlin is vivid and compelling, with scenes, like that of Merlin's first meeting with Vivian and his final parting, which rival the best in drama for beauty and intensity.

References

Footnotes

Bibliography

American poems
1917 poems
Works by Edwin Arlington Robinson
Arthurian literature in English
Works based on Merlin
Modern Arthurian fiction